This is a list of the winners of the Belarusian Chess Championships. 

| valign="top" |
{| class="sortable wikitable"
! # !! Year !!  Champions (women)
|-
| 1||1928||S. Duner
|-
| 2||1939||Shames
|-
| 3||1952||G. Neviadomskaya
|-
| 4||1954||G. Neviadomskaya
|-
| 5||1955||Nekrasova
|-
| 6||1957||Elena Lychkovskaya  G. Neviadomskaya
|-
| 7||1959||L. Chuvashova
|-
| 8||1960||Kira Zvorykina
|-
| 9||1961||Galina Archakova
|-
| 10||1962||Galina Archakova
|-
| 11||1963||Galina Archakova
|-
| 12||1965||Tamara Golovey
|-
| 13||1966||Galina Archakova
|-
| 14||1968||Galina Archakova
|-
| 15||1969||Tamara Golovey
|-
| 16||1971||G. Ozhigina
|-
| 17||1973||Kira Zvorykina
|-
| 18||1974||Tatiana Kostina
|-
| 19||1975||Kira Zvorykina
|-
| 20||1976||Tamara Golovey
|-
| 21||1977||Irina Turapina
|-
| 22||1978||Ludmila Tsifanskaya
|-
| 23||1979||G. Ozhigina
|-
| 24||1980||Irina Turapina
|-
| 25||1981||Elmira Khorovets
|-
| 26||1982||Tatiana Zagorskaya
|-
| 27||1983||Tatiana Zagorskaya
|-
| 28||1984||Elmira Khorovets
|-
| 29||1985||Rakhil Eidelson
|-
| 30||1986||Irina Botvinnik
|-
| 31||1987||Elmira Khorovets
|-
| 32||1988||Elena Zayats
|-
| 33||1989||Rakhil Eidelson
|-
| 34||1990||Ilaha Kadimova
|-
| 35||1991||O. Lomakina
|-
| 36||1992||Tatiana Zagorskaya
|-
| 37||1993||Rakhil Eidelson
|-
| 38||1994||Tatiana Zagorskaya
|-
| 39||1995||Rakhil Eidelson
|-
| 40||1996||Tatiana Zagorskaya
|-
| 41||1997||Rakhil Eidelson
|-
| 42||1998||Rakhil Eidelson
|-
| 43||1999||Natalia Popova
|-
| 44||2000||Natalia Popova
|-
| 45||2001||Irina Tetenkina
|-
| 46||2002||Anna Sharevich
|-
| 47||2003||Rakhil Eidelson
|-
| 48||2004||Rakhil Eidelson
|-
| 49||2005||Anna Sharevich
|-
| 50||2006||Natalia Popova
|-
| 51||2007||Anna Sharevich
|-
| 52||2008||Natalia Popova
|-
| 53||2009||Natalia Popova
|-
| 54||2010||Nastassia Ziaziulkina
|-
| 55||2011||Anna Sharevich
|-
| 56||2012||Nastassia Ziaziulkina
|-
| 57||2013||Nastassia Ziaziulkina
|-
| 58||2014||Maria Nevioselaya
|-
| 59||2015||Lanita Stetsko
|-
| 60||2016|| Nastassia Ziaziulkina
|-
| 61||2017|| Nastassia Ziaziulkina
|-
| 62||2018|| Nastassia Ziaziulkina
|-
| 63||2019|| Aliaksandra Tarasenka
|-
| 64||2020|| Kseniya Zeliantsova
|}
|
{
| valign="top" |
{| class="sortable wikitable"
! # !! Year !!  Champions (U20)
|-
|1
|2020
|Mihail Nikitenko
|}
|}

References

External links
Complete list of the men's championship (1924-2008) 
Complete list of the women's championship (1928-2007) 
 (some player first names)
RUSBASE, part V, 1919–1937 and 1991–1994
RUSBASE, part IV, 1938–1960
RUSBASE, part III, 1961–1969 and 1985–1990
RUSBASE, part II, 1970–1984
The Week in Chess: 1999, 2003, 2004, 2005, 2006, 2007, 2008, 2012
FIDE: 2002 men, 2009 men, 2010 men , 2013 men, 2013 women
ChessBase: 2011
chessblog.com: 2014
Chessdom: 2015
chess-news-ru: 2014 men, 2015
Short biography of Sergei Azarov, 2001 and 2002 winner 

Chess national championships
Women's chess national championships
Chess in Belarus
Chess in the Soviet Union
Chess